Mull is a surname. Notable people with the surname include:

Brandon Mull (born 1974), American writer
Carter Mull (born 1977), American artist
Clay Mull (born 1979), American speed skater
Gary Mull (1937–1993), American yacht designer
J. Bazzel Mull (1914–2006), American religious broadcaster
Jack Mull (born 1943), American baseball player, coach and manager
Martin Mull (born 1943), American actor
Pres Mull (1922–2005), American football coach
Stephen Mull (born 1958), American diplomat